Joseph Baffoe (born 7 November 1992) is a Swedish professional footballer who plays for Halmstads BK as a centre-back.

Club career
Baffoe started off in IFK Värnamo and played there at senior level for one year. After that he signed for Allsvenska team HIF.

Baffoe signed for Helsingborg as a 17-year-old.  His first full game was when they played against F.C. Copenhagen at home at Olympia.

On 26 July 2015, Baffoe signed a three-year contract with German 2. Bundesliga side Eintracht Braunschweig. He left the club at the end of his contract in summer 2018.

In July 2018, Baffoe's planned trial with Hamburger SV, newly relegated to the 2. Bundesliga, was called off due to lacking fitness. On 7 January 2019, he joined MSV Duisburg. He left Duisburg after the 2018–19 season.

Personal life
Baffoe's parents have their roots in Ghana.

Honours
Helsingborgs IF
Allsvenskan: 2011
Svenska Cupen: 2011
Svenska Supercupen: 2012
Sweden U21
UEFA European Under-21 Championship: 2015

References

External links

 
 

1992 births
Living people
Footballers from Accra
Association football defenders
Ghanaian emigrants to Sweden
Swedish footballers
Sweden youth international footballers
Sweden under-21 international footballers
Ghanaian footballers
Swedish people of Ghanaian descent
IFK Värnamo players
Helsingborgs IF players
Vålerenga Fotball players
Halmstads BK players
Eintracht Braunschweig players
MSV Duisburg players
Allsvenskan players
Eliteserien players
2. Bundesliga players
Swedish expatriate footballers
Expatriate footballers in Norway
Expatriate footballers in Germany
Swedish expatriate sportspeople in Norway
Swedish expatriate sportspeople in Germany